Allen Harry Levrault (born August 15, 1977) is a former Major League Baseball pitcher for the Milwaukee Brewers and Florida Marlins. He was drafted by the Milwaukee Brewers in the 13th round of the 1996 Major League Baseball Draft.

Levrault graduated from Westport High School in Westport, Massachusetts in 1995.

In 2002 Levrault played for the Oakland Athletics Triple-A affiliate the Sacramento River Cats.

In 2003, he pitched in 19 games for the World Champions Florida Marlins. He went 1-0 with a 3.86 ERA with 15 walks and 21 strikeouts. He pitched in his final major league game on June 27, 2003.

In , Levrault played for the Seattle Mariners' Double-A affiliate, the San Antonio Missions.

Allen in 2001 was featured in A Player to be Named Later, a documentary about the life of a Triple-A ball player who played for the Milwaukee Brewers affiliate at the time the Indianapolis Indians.

Allen was married on September 5, 2009 to Vanessa Joy Quirk Levrault of Swansea, Massachusetts. They currently reside in Westport, Massachusetts) with their son and daughter.

External links
, or Retrosheet, or  Pura Pelota (Venezuelan Winter League)

1977 births
Living people 
Águilas del Zulia players
Albuquerque Isotopes players
Baseball players from Massachusetts
Beloit Snappers players
CCRI Knights baseball players
Community College of Rhode Island alumni
El Paso Diablos players
Elmira Pioneers players
Florida Marlins players
Helena Brewers players
Huntsville Stars players
Indianapolis Indians players
Joliet JackHammers players
Louisville RiverBats players
Major League Baseball pitchers
Milwaukee Brewers players
People from Fall River, Massachusetts
Sacramento River Cats players
San Antonio Missions players
Stockton Ports players
Tiburones de La Guaira players
American expatriate baseball players in Venezuela